Mouse-A-Mania is the eight studio album by Jamaican reggae singer Eek-A-Mouse. The album is a collection of two of The Mouse's prior albums The Assassinator (1983) and The King And I (1985).

Track listing

1987 compilation albums